Indrani Mukherjee (born 1 March 1942) is an Indian actress who worked in Hindi films during the 1960s and 1970s and starred in over 70 films. After playing the heroine in some films, notably Usne Kaha Tha (1960) and Aakhri Khat (1966), she moved to playing character roles which were central to the film and made this her forte. Her roles in films like Dharam Veer (1977), Parvarish (1977) and Des Pardes (1978) were the pivot of the storyline, but they were not conventional heroine roles. Each of the movies were a success at the box office.

Early life
Mukherjee was born in Allahabad, United Provinces, into a Bengali Brahmin family. Her father, Dr. Jitendra Mukherjee, was a doctor of medicine who practised in Allahabad. Her mother, Kamini Devi Mukherjee, was a devoted home-maker. Indrani was one of seven children. She had four sisters and two brothers.

Career
In 1960, she was screentested by Bimal Roy, which led to her debut with Usne Kaha Tha (1960), directed by Moni Bhattacharjee and produced by Roy, with Sunil Dutt and Nanda as the leads. Her next film was Dharmputra (1961), opposite Shashi Kapoor and directed by Yash Chopra, and which won the National Film Award for Best Feature Film in Hindi Her next big film was the war film Haqeeqat (1964), directed by Chetan Anand, who subsequently cast her as the lead, opposite debutant Rajesh Khanna in Aakhri Khat (1966), the film received critical acclaim, and was India's entry to the Academy Awards.

For the next decade, Indrani became a regular feature in Hindi films as a character actor in notable films such as Mere Lal (the famous song "Payal Ki Jhankar Raste Raste" was picturised on her), Grahasti, Heer Raanjha (1970), Parvarish (1977) and Dharam Veer (1977), the Dharmendra starrer, in which she played the pivotal role of Rajmata (Queen Mother).

She also acted in a few Marathi and Bhojpuri films including Apradh and Laagi Nahi Chhute Ram (1963). In 1984, Indrani retired from Hindi cinema.

Personal life and family
Indrani grew up in a healthy and wholesome, traditional environment. She prioritized her family above all else and takes great pride in having been a good and successful wife and mother. She married Krishanlal Khanna, a Punjabi Khatri, and moved to Nashik outside Mumbai in 1992. The couple were blessed with four children, two sons and two daughters. All of them are well educated and well settled in life. Indrani's sons are named Anirudh Khanna and Dipankar Khanna, and they continue to live in Nashik. Both of them are married, and Indrani's daughters-in-law are Anju Khanna (née Ahuja) and Niketa Khanna.

Indrani's elder daughter Deepanjali Chhapwale is married to Rahul Chhapwale, from Ambedkar Nagar, Madhya Pradesh. They live in London and are the parents of four children, three daughters, named Charulata, Chitralekha and Avantika, and a son, Vikram Aditya Chhapwale. Indrani's younger daughter Moyna Bannerjee is married to Rahul Banerjee, a Bengali Brahmin gentleman of her own caste and similar family background. They live in Bangalore and are the parents of two children, a son named Ranveer Bannerjee and a daughter, Nivedita Bannerjee.

Selected filmography

 Usne Kaha Tha (1960) - Farida
 Dharmputra (1961) - Meena
 Shaadi (1962) - Kala R. Malhotra
 Laagi Nahi Chhute Ram (1963) - Parvati - Suraj's sister
 Grahasti (1963) - Kamini
 Suhagan (1964) - Sharda's mom
 Haqeeqat (1964) - Ram Swarup's wife
 Chandi Ki Deewar (1964)
 Bagalar Banga Darshan (1964, Bengali)
 Shaheed (1965) - Susheela
 Bharat Milap (1965) - Devi Maa Sita
 Mere Lal (1966) - Jamuna
 Kunwari (1966)
 Aakhri Khat (1966)
 Naunihal (1967) - Uma
 Ghar Ka Chirag (1967)
 Patni (1970)
 Pardes (1970)
 Heer Raanjha (1970)
 Aan Milo Sajna (1970) - Sita
 Truck Driver (1970)
 Sharafat (1970) - (Guest appearance)
 Hare Rama Hare Krishna (1971) - Mrs. Jaiswal (2nd)
 Naya Zamana (1971) - Asha
 Baazigar (1972)
 Bhai Ho To Aisa (1972) - Gayatri
 Zameen Aasmaan (1972) - Urmilla / Maya
 Parchhaiyan (1972) - Seeta
 Dil Ka Raja (1972) - Gauri Singh
 Raja Rani (1973) - Janaki
 Prem Parvat (1973)
 Daaman Aur Aag (1973) - Soni
 Aangan (1973)
 Paap Aur Punya (1974) - Nun
 Trimurti (1974) - Laxmi
 Shaitaan (1974) - Bablu's mom
 Ek Hans Ka Jora (1975) - Anil's sister-in-law
 Zameer (1975) - Mrs. Rukmini Maharaj Singh
 Sanyasi (1975) - Devotee
 Teesra Patthar (1976)
 Suntan (1976)
 Do Khiladi (1976) - Shobha
 Yaaron Ka Yaar (1977) - Shakuntala
 Palkon Ki Chhaon Mein (1977)
 Parvarish (1977) - DSP's wife
 Kitaab (1977) - Kusum
 Ek Hi Raasta (1977)
 Dharam Veer (1977) - Maharani Meenakshi
 Chacha Bhatija (1977) - Sita
 Ab Kya Hoga (1977) -Mrs. Sinha (Raj's Mother)
 Bandie (1978) - Badi Rani
 Des Pardes (1978) - Rama Sahni
 Apna Khoon (1978) - Shanta Verma
 Bhookh (1978) - Thakurain
 Tumhare Liye (1978) - Saudamani
 Amar Shakti (1978) - Leela
 Sarkari Mehmaan (1979) - Didi Maa
 Jhoota Kahin Ka (1979) - Mrs. Shanti Rai
 Jaani Dushman (1979) - Thakurain (Shera's Mother)
 Mr. Natwarlal (1979) - Seema Singh
 Lahu Ke Do Rang (1979) - Ladjo Singh
 Yuvraaj (1979) - Maharani Meenakshi
 Love in Canada (1979) - Shonba
 Jaan-e-Bahaar (1979) - Mrs. Rai
 Dada (1979) - Mrs. Pyarelal
 The Burning Train (1980) - Padmini (Rajaram's wife)
 Gehrayee (1980) - Saroja
 Aas Paas (1981) - Munni
 Fiffty Fiffty (1981) - Mrs. Shanti Singh
 Ghamandee (1981) - Kamlesh's Mother
 Chorni (1982) - Mrs. Uma Sinha
 Rajput (1982) - Rupmati - Manu's Chachi
 Meraa Dost Meraa Dushman (1984) - Janki (Shakti's mom)
 Nirnayak (1997) - Neelam
 Aalo Chhaya (2014) - Mom (final film role)

References

External links
 

Indian film actresses
Actresses in Hindi cinema
Living people
Actresses from Allahabad
20th-century Indian actresses
1945 births